Kontinent was a  Luxembourgish band who has represented Luxembourg in Eurovision Song Contest 1992, with Marion Welter, who performed the song Sou fräi (As free). Members of the band were also songwriters Ab van Goor and Jang Linster. The group members on stage were Ander Hirtt, Patrick Hartert on keyboards, Rom Heck on guitar (he was also a member of Park Café in 1989) and Gordon Smith on bass.

References

Luxembourgian musical groups
Eurovision Song Contest entrants for Luxembourg
Eurovision Song Contest entrants of 1992